The Queen Elizabeth II Golden Jubilee Medal or the Queen's Golden Jubilee Medal was a commemorative medal created in 2002 to mark the 50th anniversary of Queen Elizabeth II's accession in 1952. The Queen Elizabeth II Golden Jubilee Medal was awarded in Canada to nominees who contributed to public life. The Queen's Golden Jubilee Medal was awarded to active personnel in the British Armed Forces and Emergency Personnel who had completed 5 years of qualifying service.

Design
The Canadian and British medals were of different designs.

Canada: The medal is gold-plated, bronze medal with a thin raised edge and, on the obverse, an effigy of Queen Elizabeth II, crowned with the George IV State Diadem and circumscribed by the words QUEEN OF CANADA • REINE DU CANADA. The reverse features a stylised maple leaf with CANADA at the bottom and the years 1952 and 2002 on the left and right of the Royal cypher and crown.

United Kingdom: The medal is of cupronickel with a gilt finish and shows the Queen wearing St. Edward's Crown, circumscribed by the inscription ELIZABETH • II • DEI • GRA • REGINA • FID • DEF; on the reverse is the shield of Royal coat of arms of the United Kingdom flanked by the years 1952 and 2002.

Both medals were issued unnamed, and are suspended from the same broad royal blue ribbon with red outer stripes and, at the centre, double white stripes with a red stripe between.

Eligibility and allocation
In Canada, the medal was administered by the Chancellery of Honours at Rideau Hall and was awarded to Canadians who made a significant contribution to their fellow citizens, their community, or to Canada over the previous fifty years. Various organisations were invited to propose the names of candidates for the medal; this included all levels of Canadian government, educational and cultural organisations, the Canadian Forces, the Royal Canadian Mounted Police, veterans' groups, sports associations, and philanthropic and charitable bodies. Of the 46,000 medals issued, approximately 9,600 medals were awarded to members of the Canadian Forces according to a system that distributed them proportionately by service (navy, army, air force), rank, and years of service, occupations, and regular force and reservists, including Rangers and honorary appointees.

Members of the British Armed Forces regular, reserve, and cadet branches, serving prison officers and members of the police and emergency services who were enrolled as of Accession Day and had been so for five years were given the medal in the United Kingdom. 94,222 members of the Army received the medal, as did 32,273 in the Royal Navy and Royal Marines, and 38,889 in the Royal Air Force. Longer serving members of the Royal Household and living holders of the Victoria Cross and the George Cross also received the medal.

Precedence
Some orders of precedence are as follows:

The medal was not awarded by New Zealand. However, it was accorded a place in the country's order of wear to accommodate British citizens who had received the medal in the UK and subsequently joined the New Zealand Defence Force.

See also
 Queen Elizabeth II Coronation Medal
 Queen Elizabeth II Silver Jubilee Medal
 Queen Elizabeth II Diamond Jubilee Medal
 Queen Elizabeth II Platinum Jubilee Medal

References

External links
 Queen Elizabeth II Golden Jubilee Medal at Canada.ca
 Commemorative Medal for Her Majesty Queen Elizabeth II’s Golden Jubilee

Golden Jubilee of Elizabeth II
Civil awards and decorations of Canada
Civil awards and decorations of the United Kingdom
Monarchy in Canada
Elizabeth II